Hualani (hua lani = "heavenly fruit") was a High Chiefess of Molokai in ancient Hawaii.

Hualani‘s parents were Chiefess Kamauliwahine and Laniaiku.

When Hualani discovered that a man named Kanipahu was a chief, she married him. Kanipahu and Hualani’s son was Kalahumoku I.

References

Hawaiian monarchs
Hawaiian chiefesses
House of Pili